Cladonia acervata is a species of cup lichen in the family Cladoniaceae. It has been found in Australia and New Zealand.

References

acervata
Lichen species
Lichens described in 2001
Lichens of Australia
Lichens of New Zealand